The 2014–15 Nemzeti Bajnokság I/A was the 84th season of the Nemzeti Bajnokság I/A, the highest tier professional basketball league in Hungary. Szolnoki Olaj won its sixth national championship.

Teams 
The following 14 clubs competed in the NB I/A during the 2014–15 season:

Regular season (Alapszakasz)

Standings

Results

Second round (Középszakasz)

1st – 5th Placement (Felsőház)

Standings

Results

6th – 10th Placement (Középház)

Standings

Results

11th – 14th Placement (Alsóház)

Standings

Results

Playoffs
Teams in bold won the playoff series. Numbers to the left of each team indicate the team's original playoff seeding. Numbers to the right indicate the score of each playoff game.

Final

Play-out
13th placed team hosted Games 1 and, plus Game 3 if necessary. 14th placed team hosted Game 2.

Individual statistics

Points

Rebounds

Assists

Blocks

Steals

Number of teams by counties

External links
 Hungarian Basketball Federaration 

Nemzeti Bajnoksag I/A (men's basketball) seasons
Hungarian
Men